Asadipus is a genus of Australian white tailed spiders that was first described by Eugène Louis Simon in 1897. Originally placed with the Corinnidae, it was moved to the Lamponidae in 2000.

Species
 it contains twenty species:
Asadipus areyonga Platnick, 2000 – Australia (Northern Territory, Queensland)
Asadipus auld Platnick, 2000 – Australia (Western Australia, South Australia)
Asadipus banjiwarn Platnick, 2000 – Australia (Western Australia)
Asadipus baranar Platnick, 2000 – Australia (Western Australia)
Asadipus barant Platnick, 2000 – Australia (Western Australia)
Asadipus barlee Platnick, 2000 – Australia (Western Australia)
Asadipus bucks Platnick, 2000 – Australia (South Australia, Victoria)
Asadipus cape Platnick, 2000 – Australia (Western Australia)
Asadipus croydon Platnick, 2000 – Australia (Queensland)
Asadipus humptydoo Platnick, 2000 – Australia (Northern Territory)
Asadipus insolens (Simon, 1896) (type) – Australia (Queensland)
Asadipus julia Platnick, 2000 – Australia (Northern Territory, Queensland)
Asadipus kunderang Platnick, 2000 – Australia
Asadipus longforest Platnick, 2000 – Australia (South Australia, Victoria, Tasmania)
Asadipus mountant Platnick, 2000 – Australia (Western Australia)
Asadipus palmerston Platnick, 2000 – Australia (Northern Territory)
Asadipus phaleratus (Simon, 1909) – Australia (Western Australia, South Australia, Queensland)
Asadipus uphill Platnick, 2000 – Australia (Queensland)
Asadipus woodleigh Platnick, 2000 – Australia (Western Australia)
Asadipus yundamindra Platnick, 2000 – Australia (Western Australia)

See also
 List of Lamponidae species

References

Araneomorphae genera
Lamponidae
Spiders of Australia